Glyn Jones is a Welsh former professional footballer who played as a goalkeeper. He went on to become a long serving youth coach and caretaker manager at Newport County.

Playing career
Jones played for the likes of Bristol Rovers making his league debut against Burnley in October 1977 in a Second division fixture. Unfortunately in his third match during that month he and Rovers faced the newly relegated Tottenham Hotspur who had an afternoon to remember as they put nine goals past Jones and his overworked defence without reply in front also of the BBC Match of the Day cameras. Ironically Glyn won plaudits for his inspired performance that afternoon and returned to Rovers Reserves team shortly afterwards. His next game was at Tottenham for the Reserves in front of a small crowd. Newport County, Bristol Rovers, Shrewsbury Town, Gloucester City and Shrewsbury Town in his playing days.  Jones league debuts for Bristol Rovers, Shrewsbury and Newport were all at Turf Moor against Burnley.

He also had brief spells with Welsh non-league duo Albion Rovers and Newport YMCA as well as Forest Green Rovers.

Coaching career
In 1997, he was appointed the Director of the youth Academy at Newport County, and in the 2001–02 season he helped lead the youth team to the English Schools' Football Association under-19 Trophy under the banner of Hartridge High School.

He oversaw the progression of many young players to the Newport County first team including Nathan Davies, Andrew Hughes and Lee Evans.

He also worked as assistant manager in a spell under Peter Nicholas. In September 2005, following the sacking of John Cornforth as manager, he was appointed as caretaker manager at Newport prior to the appointment of Peter Beadle.

He was succeeded after 17 years as Academy Director in May 2014 by Michael Flynn.

In October 2014, he was appointed as goalkeeper coach at Forest Green Rovers in the Conference National.

In June 2021, he joined Southern Football League side Larkhall Athletic to assist Phil Bater on his coaching staff.

Jones is related to former Bristol City, Shrewsbury Town and Hereford United defender Darren Jones, and played a key role in signing him for his first spell at Newport County in February 2004.

He is also a part of the coaching staff in the Welsh FA schools set-up.

References

Newport County A.F.C. players
Aston Villa F.C. players
Bristol Rovers F.C. players
Shrewsbury Town F.C. players
Gloucester City A.F.C. players
Newport County A.F.C. managers
Welsh footballers
Living people
1959 births
Association football goalkeepers
Welsh football managers
Newport YMCA F.C. players